Peter James Taylor  (born 21 November 1944) is an English geographer. Born in Calverton in Nottinghamshire, he was Professor of Political Geography at the University of Newcastle upon Tyne between 1970 and 1996, before joining Loughborough University as Professor of Geography Since 2010, he has worked at Northumbria University. He is the co-founding editor of the journal Political Geography, and is the founder and director of the Globalization and World Cities Research Network and is the author of over 300 publications, of which over 60 have been translated into other languages. In September 2010, he became a Professor of Geography at Northumbria University.

In 2004, Taylor was elected a Fellow of the British Academy (FBA), the United Kingdom's national academy.

Publications

 International Handbook of Globalization and World Cities (2011)
 Political Geography: World-Economy, Nation-State, Locality (2011)
 Global Urban Analysis: a Survey of Cities in Globalization (2010)
 Cities in Globalization (2006)
 World City Network: a Global Urban Analysis (2004)
 Modernities: a Geohistorical Introduction (1999)
 The Way the Modern World Works: from World Hegemony to World Impasse (1996)

References

External links
 Professor Peter Taylor , homepage at Department of Geography, Loughborough University
 Professor Peter J Taylor, homepage at Department of Geography and Environment, Northumbria University

Urban theorists
British geographers
Political geographers
Academics of Loughborough University
Academics of Northumbria University
Fellows of the Academy of Social Sciences
Fellows of the British Academy
People educated at Henry Mellish Grammar School
1944 births
Living people
People from Calverton, Nottinghamshire